GpsDrive is a computer program designed to act as a vehicle navigation system. The program displays its user's position, obtained from an NMEA-capable GPS receiver, on a zoomable map drawn on a computer screen. The map file is automatically selected depending on the position and preferred scale.

Currently, GpsDrive uses raster images of maps, but plans for its development include the utilization of vector data from projects such as OpenStreetMap. Speech output is supported if Festival software is running. GpsDrive is designed to work with all Garmin GPS receivers having a serial port, as well as other GPS receivers with NMEA protocol support.

GpsDrive is written in C, with use of the GTK+ graphical widget toolkit, and runs on Linux, FreeBSD and other Unix-like systems. It has interface support for different languages, such as English, German and French. It is available under the GNU General Public License.

See also

 Gpsd

External links
 
 SourceForge support pages (Wiki site, extended documentation, bug tracker, SVN code repository, screenshots, etc.)
 Finding Your Way with GpsDrive article from LinuxJournal

Free transport software
Global Positioning System
Linux software
Unix software
Free software programmed in C
Mapping software that uses GTK